Pirajuí is a municipality in the state of São Paulo in Brazil. The population is 25,719 (2020 est.) in an area of 823 km².

References

External links
Pirajui.net
Official municipality website

Municipalities in São Paulo (state)